The Duchess of Hamilton is usually the spouse of the Duke of Hamilton, but in one case is a Duchess of Hamilton in her own right (suo jure). Duke of Hamilton is an extant title in the Peerage of Scotland which was created in 1643.

Duchesses of Hamilton
 Mary Feilding, wife of James Hamilton, 1st Duke of Hamilton
 Lady Elizabeth Maxwell, wife of William Hamilton, 2nd Duke of Hamilton
 Anne Hamilton, 3rd Duchess of Hamilton, who held the title in her own right (suo jure)
 Elizabeth Gerard, 2nd wife of James Hamilton, 4th Duke of Hamilton
 Anne Hamilton, Duchess of Hamilton (Lady Anne Cochrane), 1st wife of James Hamilton, 5th Duke of Hamilton
 Elizabeth Hamilton, Duchess of Hamilton (Elizabeth Strangways), 2nd wife of James Hamilton, 5th Duke of Hamilton
 Anne Hamilton, Duchess of Hamilton (Anne Spencer), 3rd wife of James Hamilton, 5th Duke of Hamilton
 Elizabeth Campbell, 1st Baroness Hamilton of Hameldon (Elizabeth Gunning; 1733–1790), wife of James Hamilton, 6th Duke of Hamilton. Afterwards Duchess of Argyll and Baroness Hamilton of Hameldon.
 Elizabeth Hamilton, Duchess of Hamilton ( née Elizabeth Anne Burrell; 1757–1837), wife of Douglas Hamilton, 8th Duke of Hamilton
 Harriet Hamilton, Duchess of Hamilton (Lady Harriet Stewart), wife of Archibald Hamilton, 9th Duke of Hamilton
 Susan Hamilton, Duchess of Hamilton (Susan Euphemia Beckford), wife of Alexander Hamilton, 10th Duke of Hamilton
 Princess Marie of Baden (1817–1888), wife of William Hamilton, 11th Duke of Hamilton
 Lady Mary Montagu, wife of William Douglas-Hamilton, 12th Duke of Hamilton
 Nina Douglas-Hamilton, Duchess of Hamilton and Brandon, wife of Alfred Douglas-Hamilton, 13th Duke of Hamilton
 Elizabeth Douglas-Hamilton, Duchess of Hamilton and Brandon (Lady Elizabeth Ivy Percy; 1916–2008), wife of Douglas Douglas-Hamilton, 14th Duke of Hamilton
 Sarah Jane Scott, 1st wife of Angus Douglas-Hamilton, 15th Duke of Hamilton
 Jillian Robertson (died 2018), 2nd wife of Angus Douglas-Hamilton, 15th Duke of Hamilton
 Kay Carmichael, 3rd wife of Angus Douglas-Hamilton, 15th Duke of Hamilton
 Sophie Rutherford, wife of Alexander Douglas-Hamilton, 16th Duke of Hamilton

See also
LMS Princess Coronation Class 6229 Duchess of Hamilton - a preserved British steam locomotive
 - a CSP turbine excursion steamer built in 1932 and scrapped in 1974